Mindiyala is a village near the town Anjar, the taluka of Kutch district in the Indian state of Gujarat.

Village is located 8 km from nearest town Anjar.

Mindiyala is the largest village of the All India Rabari Samaj and is considered to be the capital of the Rabari Samaj& Culture Hub .(Rajdhani) Rupesh pethani & Vishal_rabari_17

See also
 Nagalpar
 Sinugra 
 Pantiya 
 Khedoi
 Lovariya
 Chandiya
 Chandroda
 Mindiyana
 Shinai
 Adipur
 Gandhidham
 Anjar
 Healthcare in India
 Primary Health Centre

Villages in Kutch district